Pietro Chiodi (2 July 1915 – 22 September 1970), born in Corteno Golgi, was an Italian philosopher and anti-fascist partisan. He was the first Italian translator of Martin Heidegger's Being and Time. He died in Turin in 1970.

Works
 L'esistenzialismo di Heidegger (1947)
 L'ultimo Heidegger (1952)
 Esistenzialismo e fenomenologia (1963)

References

1915 births
1970 deaths
Italian resistance movement members
Italian anti-fascists
20th-century Italian translators
20th-century Italian philosophers